Jeanne Jégou-Cadart was a French painter from the late 19th to early 20th centuries. She lived in Paris and in Kernouës, Brittany.

Paintings of Jeanne Jégou-Cadart at Carnavalet Museum in Paris.

See also
 Lesneven in Brittany, France
 Kernouës in Brittany, France

References

French women painters
19th-century births
20th-century deaths
19th-century French painters
20th-century French painters
19th-century French women artists
20th-century French women artists